The 2015 Parapan American Games torch relay was a 5-day torch relay, from August 3 to 7, 2015, being held prior to the start of the Games. Two torches were lit, one in the west at Niagara Falls and one in the east at Ottawa.

An application period for Canadians to carry the torch opened from April 7 to 19, 2015. Anyone aged 13 or older as of August 3, 2015 was eligible to become a torchbearer. Most of the torchbearers were selected by a random selection, while the others were selected by torch relay communities and games partners. The torch was carried by 250 torchbearers.

Route

All cities are in the Province of Ontario.

See also
 2015 Pan American Games torch relay

References

External links
Official website

2015 Parapan American Games